Velvet Sky was a low cost airline based at the King Shaka International Airport near Durban, South Africa. The airline launched in March 2011. It ceased operations in February 2012 and was liquidated in May 2012.

History
Velvet Sky Aviation was established in 2009 as a subsidiary of Macdonald Holdings. Flight operations began on 22 March 2011. It was the only airline based in Durban and claimed to be the first Broad-Based Black Economic Empowerment compliant airline in South Africa.

On 25 March 2011 technical problems with the airline's only aircraft caused a seven-hour delay at Johannesburg. A replacement aircraft had to be chartered and a new aircrew had to be brought in as the Boeing 737, built in 1988, was grounded for repairs. The original crew could not continue the flight as they would have exceeded their duty hours limit. Customers also complained about poor service relating to problems with the airline's website and telephone service.

Sale of airline
On 1 July 2011 McDonald Holdings announced that it had reached an agreement with Excalibur Aerospace to sell all its shares in the airline. The chairman of Excalibur Aerospace, Stephen Nthite, became the chairman of the airline as a consequence. Confirming the purchase of the airline, Excalibur Aerospace announced that they would retain Dhevan Pillay as CEO and Gary Webb as COO. In addition, the new owners announced plans to increase the fleet of aircraft in operation from August 2011.

Route expansion
The airline had plans to extend their routes into other countries in Southern Africa when their fleet enlarged.

In November 2011 the airline added a route between Durban and Cape Town direct as well as via Port Elizabeth, when two more 737s were added to their fleet.

Services between Johannesburg and Polokwane International Airport began in September 2011, but were abruptly ended in January 2012 when the airport operator became involved in controversy over corruption.

Cancellation of flights and liquidation

On 20 January 2012 the airline had its aviation fuel supplies embargoed due to outstanding bills. Temporary measures were put in place to secure fuel, but by late February the supplier, BP Southern Africa, had applied to the Pietermaritzburg, KwaZulu-Natal high court for a liquidation order against the airline. The application was heard on Friday 24 February 2012. The liquidation was not granted immediately and the airline was given time to respond to 5 March 2012. Simultaneously its Air Maintenance Organization (AMO), SAA Technical, withdrew their services, allegedly for unpaid maintenance bills. The ground handling service provider, Menzies Aviation, had also been engaged in payment disputes with the airline for some time.

On 22 February 2012 hundreds of passengers were left stranded at Cape Town International Airport, Velvet Sky Airlines confirmed that its flights were delayed because of a dispute with a service provider.

On Thursday 23 February 2012 the airline was forced to cancel most of its flights due to a lack of an AMO as well as fuel delivery problems. Normal operations resumed after midday on Friday 24 February 2012 but were cancelled again on Monday 27 February after further service provider disputes.

The airline management issued a statement to the media shortly after midday on 27 February 2012 in which it cited the various disputes overpayments to suppliers, the negative publicity generated by the flight cancellations and the need to re-structure the management with a concurrent attempt at re-capitalising the balance sheet as reasons for the suspension of all flight operations to 5 March 2012.

On 7 March the airline and its creditors reached an agreement to postpone the liquidation application indefinitely. One of the creditors applied to launch an application for a business rescue plan. The court gave Umzamo Transport Services (which is owed about R4 million) until 10 April to file supplementary papers to support its rescue plan application.

On 7 May 2012 the airline was placed under provisional liquidation. The liquidation was finalised on 21 June 2012.

Destinations
Velvet Sky served the following destinations:

 Cape Town – Cape Town International Airport
 Durban – King Shaka International Airport Hub
 Johannesburg – OR Tambo International Airport
 Port Elizabeth – Port Elizabeth Airport
 Polokwane – Polokwane International Airport

Fleet

The fleet consisted of three Boeing 737-300s leased from Aergo Capital The aircraft were configured with 148 passenger seats in a single class cabin and a Douglas DC-9 leased from Global Aviation.

References

External links

 

Defunct airlines of South Africa
Defunct low-cost airlines
Airlines established in 2009
Airlines disestablished in 2012
2009 establishments in South Africa
2012 disestablishments in South Africa
Companies based in KwaZulu-Natal
South African companies established in 2009
EThekwini Metropolitan Municipality